The mixed 4 × 100 metre freestyle relay event in swimming at the 2014 Summer Youth Olympics took place on 17 August at the Nanjing Olympic Sports Centre in Nanjing, China.

Results

Heats
The heats were held at 11:22.

Final
The final was held at 18:51.

References

Swimming at the 2014 Summer Youth Olympics
Youth Olympics